Neftchala is a city and the capital of the Neftchala District of Azerbaijan.

Etymology 
The city name is of Persian ("naft" meaning oil or petroleum) and Azerbaijani ("çala" meaning trench) origin, meaning oil trench.

History

Throughout its history, Neftçala has suffered from floods because of its proximity to the river and most of the town's relatively low elevation.

Today, there are a palace of culture, regional study museum and gallery museum in the city.

Geography

The city lies southwest of the delta of the Kura River.

Demographics

Population (2010):Total 20,510

Economy
People are mainly employed in manufacturing, fish industry, transportation and service sectors. The largest employer operating in Neftcala, Neftcala Industrial Park which includes "Khazar Automobile Plant" by AzerMash.

Culture

Sports
The city has one professional football team, Neftchala, which has competed in the second-flight of Azerbaijani football, the Azerbaijan First Division, but the team is eliminated after 2 years of championship in the Azerbaijan First Division and not getting the license for competing in the Azerbaijan Premier League.

Transport

Public transport
Neftchala has a large urban transport system, mostly managed by the Ministry of Transportation.

Education

Notable residents

Some of the city's many prestigious residents include: singer Anatollu Ganiyev and World War II hero Aghashirin Jafarov.

References

External links
Neftchala City Executive Powers 

Populated places in Neftchala District
1959 establishments in Azerbaijan